Mark Steinle (born 22 November 1974) is a British long-distance runner. He competed in the men's marathon at the 2000 Summer Olympics.

References

External links
 

1974 births
Living people
Athletes (track and field) at the 2000 Summer Olympics
British male long-distance runners
British male marathon runners
Olympic athletes of Great Britain
Place of birth missing (living people)